Agonopterix furvella is a moth of the family Depressariidae. It is found in France, Germany, Italy, Austria, the Czech Republic, Poland, Slovakia, Hungary, Croatia, Romania, Bulgaria, North Macedonia, Albania, Greece, Ukraine and Russia.

The wingspan is 23–28 mm.

The larvae feed on Dictamnus albus.

References

External links
lepiforum.de

Moths described in 1832
Agonopterix
Moths of Europe
Taxa named by Georg Friedrich Treitschke